Eucalyptus gracilis, commonly known as yorrell, snap and rattle, red mallee, white mallee or kong mallee, is a species of mallee or small tree endemic to Australia, where it is found in south-western New South Wales, Victoria, South Australia and Western Australia. It has smooth white bark, usually with rough, fibrous or flaky bark on the lower stems, linear to narrow lance-shaped adult leaves, flower buds in group of between seven and eleven and cup-shaped, cylindrical or barrel-shaped fruit.

Description
It has smooth white, grey and coppery-cream bark, but usually rough, fibrous or flaky bark at the base of the stems. It blooms between March and October producing creamy-white flowers.

Taxonomy and naming
Eucalyptus gracilis was first formally described by the botanist Ferdinand von Mueller in 1855 in Transactions and Proceedings of the Victorian Institute for the Advancement of Science, from specimens collected "in the desert on the Murray River". The species name is the Latin adjective gracilis "slender", likely referring to its branches and habit.

Eucalyptus yilgarnensis was formerly considered a subspecies of this species.

Distribution and habitat
Yorrell grows on sand dunes and plains, crests of rises and along creek lines in the Eremaean and South West botanical regions of Western Australia where it grows in sandy-clay-loamy soils over limestone. It is found throughout most of southern and central South Australia where it grows in mallee shrubland in a range of soils, often over limestone. In Victoria it is confined to the north-west of the state, mostly in the Big Desert and Sunset Country, east to Manangatang. It also occurs in south western New South Wales where it is found in mallee shrubland on red aeolian sands south from Yathong and west from West Wyalong.

Cultivation
E. gracilis is often cultivated in open areas, wider verges, in parks and reserves and as a shelter wind-break or for erosion control. It is also known to be good for honey production. Nectar-eating birds and insects use it for food and habitat. The yellow-tailed black cockatoo consumes the seeds of this species.

References

gracilis
Trees of Australia
Mallees (habit)
Flora of New South Wales
Flora of South Australia
Flora of Victoria (Australia)
Eucalypts of Western Australia
Myrtales of Australia
Plants described in 1854
Taxa named by Ferdinand von Mueller